Eduardo Cremasco (1946 – 11 September 1988) was an Argentine footballer.

References

1946 births
1988 deaths
Association football midfielders
Argentine footballers
Estudiantes de La Plata footballers
Club América footballers